LTR-Net is a type of LTR Trunked Radio System that is a backward compatible with LTR Standard.  LTR Standard radios can be used on an LTR-Net system.

Logic Trunked Radio